Kevin Foley (born 9 January 1960) is an Irish Gaelic football manager, selector and former player. His league and championship career at senior level with the Meath county team spanned eight seasons from 1986 to 1993.

Born in Trim, County Meath, Foley was raised in a family with a strong affinity for Gaelic football. He played competitive Gaelic football during his schooldays at Trim CBS and St. Patrick's Classical School in Navan. However, he favored soccer during his studies at University College Dublin. By this stage, Foley played club football with Trim, having begun his club career at juvenile and underage levels. He won a county junior championship medal in 1978.

In spite of never having played in the minor, under-21 or junior grades with Meath, Foley was added to the senior panel for the 1986 championship. Over the course of the next seven years, he won two All-Ireland medals as part of a two-in-a-row in 1987 and 1988. Foley also won five Leinster medals and two National Football League medals.

As a member of the Leinster inter-provincial team in 1988 Foley won his sole Railway Cup medal.

In retirement from playing Foley became involved in team management and coaching. He was manager of the Clonard team that won their first county junior championship title in forty years in 2011. Foley also served as a selector with the Meath minor team.

Career statistics

Honours

Player

Meath
All-Ireland Senior Football Championship (2): 1987, 1988
Leinster Senior Football Championship (5): 1986, 1987, 1988, 1990, 1991
National Football League (2): 1987–88, 1989–90

Leinster
Railway Cup (1): 1988

Manager

Clonard
Meath Junior B Football Championship (1): 2011

References

1960 births
Living people
Gaelic football backs
Gaelic football managers
Gaelic football selectors
Leinster inter-provincial Gaelic footballers
Meath inter-county Gaelic footballers
Trim Gaelic footballers